Mihaela Albu (born ) is a Romanian female volleyball player. She is part of the Romania women's national volleyball team.

She competed at the 2015 European Games and 2015 Women's European Volleyball Championship. On club level she plays for CS Medgidia.

Clubs
  VC Unic Piatra Neamț (2009–2013)
  CS Știința Bacău (2013–2018)
  CS Medgidia (2018–present)

References

External links
 Profile at CEV

1994 births
Living people
Romanian women's volleyball players
Volleyball players at the 2015 European Games
European Games competitors for Romania